Sulfinpyrazone is a uricosuric medication used to treat gout.  It also sometimes is used to reduce platelet aggregation by inhibiting degranulation of platelets which reduces the release of ADP and thromboxane. 

Like other uricosurics, sulfinpyrazone works by competitively inhibiting uric acid reabsorption in the proximal tubule of the kidney.

Contraindications
Sulfinpyrazone must not be used in persons with renal impairment or a history of uric acid kidney stones.

Research 
Trial have found that, Sulfinpyrazone taken in specific daily dose immediately following a patient having suffered from a myocardial infarction seem to drastically reduce the incidence of sudden death by as much as 43% and cardiac mortality by 32% in the 24 months following their heart attack.

References 

Antigout agents
Pyrazolidindiones